Sir John Eldon Gorst  (25 June 1861 – 12 July 1911) was Consul-General in Egypt from 1907–1911.

Career
Gorst was the son of Sir John Eldon Gorst, Solicitor General for England and Wales and Vice-President of the Committee of the Council on Education. Born in New Zealand but raised in London, Gorst attended Eton College and Trinity College, Cambridge. In 1885 he became both a barrister and a member of the British diplomatic corps, going to Egypt the following year as controller of direct taxes, becoming undersecretary for finance in 1892, adviser to the Egyptian Interior Ministry in 1894, and Financial adviser to the Egyptian government in 1898. He was promoted to a Knight Commander of the Order of the Bath (KCB) in the 1902 Coronation Honours list published on 26 June 1902, and received the order and knighthood on 22 September 1902, during a visit to King Edward VII at Balmoral Castle. He was back in Egypt in time to receive Lord Kitchener during a short visit in late October 1902, when Kitchener was en route to take up the appointment as Commander-in-Chief, India. In 1904 Gorst returned to London where, as undersecretary of state, he effectively represented Lord Cromer in the Foreign Office.

After the Liberal Party came to power, the British government sent Gorst to replace Cromer with instructions to give Egyptians greater responsibility to manage their internal affairs. As British Agent and Consul General in Egypt, Gorst quickly improved the Agency's relationship with Khedive Abbas Hilmi II, brought more Egyptians into responsible government positions, and weakened the Egyptian National Party. However, his efforts to rein in the burgeoning corps of Anglo-Egyptian officials offended many old Egypt hands. The appointment of Boutros Ghali as prime minister, popularly ascribed to Gorst, angered the Nationalists and many other Egyptians, leading to press attacks and eventually to Boutros Ghali's assassination. The revival of the Press Law in 1909 alienated Europeans as well as Egyptians and proved unenforceable. Gorst's attempt to extend the Suez Canal Company's concession in 1909–1910 to raise additional funds for development in Egypt and the Sudan was disliked by all Egyptians; when he put the issue to the Egyptian General Assembly, vehement opposition from the Nationalist press led to its rejection.

This rejection, together with the murder of Boutros Ghali, caused Gorst to abandon his lenient policy in favor of a harsher one, using the Exceptional Laws and various penal measures to stifle the Nationalists. He had almost restored British control when he became stricken with cancer and went back to England to die.

An unprepossessing and egotistical man, disliked by the older British colonial administrators in Egypt and distrusted by the Egyptians as sphinxlike, Gorst was never accorded the respect that his intelligence and strong will warranted, although he received the Grand Cordons of the Osmanieh and Mejidiye Orders and was a Knight Commander of Sts. Michael and George. His autobiographical notes and diaries are at St Antony's College, Oxford and other papers are in the possession of his grandson, Paul Lysley.

Eldon Gorst was also the lover for two years in the 1880s of (Christina Anne) Jessica Sykes, née Cavendish-Bentinck, whose son Sir Mark Sykes, 6th Bt., later married 1903 Eldon's younger sister Edith.

Works

References

Further reading
Arthur Goldschmidt Jr., Biographical Dictionary of Modern Egypt Boulder, CO: Lynne Rienner, 2000.
Sir Archie Hunter. Power and Passion in Egypt: A Life of Sir Eldon Gorst London: I.B. Tauris, 2007. (extracts available via GoogleBooks)
Peter Mellini, Sir Eldon Gorst: The Overshadowed Proconsul Stanford, CA, Hoover Institution Press, 1977.

External links

1861 births
1911 deaths
People educated at Eton College
Alumni of Trinity College, Cambridge
British consuls-general in Egypt
Knights Grand Cross of the Order of St Michael and St George
Knights Commander of the Order of the Bath
Recipients of the Order of the Medjidie